Saskatoon Northwest is a provincial electoral district for the Legislative Assembly of Saskatchewan, Canada. It covers the neighbourhoods of Lawson Heights, Silverwood Heights and the surrounding area. This constituency includes the Saskatoon Correctional Centre and the SaskTel Centre.

Members of the Legislative Assembly

Election results

 
|NDP
|Nicole White
|align="right"|1,718
|align="right"|25.39
|align="right"|-7.67

|Liberal
|Eric Steiner
|align="right"|135
|align="right"|2.00
|align="right"|-1.03
|- bgcolor="white"
!align="left" colspan=3|Total
!align="right"|6,767
!align="right"|100.00
!align="right"|

|-

 
|NDP
|Jan Dyky
|align="right"|1,711
|align="right"|33.06
|align="right"|+3.38

|Liberal
|Eric Steiner
|align="right"|157
|align="right"|3.03
|align="right"|-11.73
 
|Prog. Conservative
|Manny Sonnenschein
|align="right"|133
|align="right"|2.57
|align="right"|-

|- bgcolor="white"
!align="left" colspan=3|Total
!align="right"|5,175
!align="right"|100.00
!align="right"|

 
|NDP
|Ken Winton-Grey
|align="right"|2,490
|align="right"|29.68
|align="right"|-7.64

|Liberal
|Ryan Androsoff
|align="right"|1,238
|align="right"|14.76
|align="right"|-7.15

|- bgcolor="white"
!align="left" colspan=3|Total
!align="right"|8,389
!align="right"|100.00
!align="right"|

|-

 
|NDP
|Jim Melenchuk
|align="right"|2,927
|align="right"|37.32
|align="right"|+2.98

|Liberal
|Ken McDonough
|align="right"|1,718
|align="right"|21.91
|align="right"|-14.38
|- bgcolor="white"
!align="left" colspan=3|Total
!align="right"|7,842
!align="right"|100.00
!align="right"|

|-
 
| style="width: 130px" |Liberal
|Jim Melenchuk
|align="right"|2,363
|align="right"|36.29
|align="right"|-4.83

|NDP
|Grant Whitmore
|align="right"|2,236
|align="right"|34.34
|align="right"|-11.47

|- bgcolor="white"
!align="left" colspan=3|Total
!align="right"|6,511
!align="right"|100.00
!align="right"|

|-
 
| style="width: 130px" |NDP
|Grant Whitmore
|align="right"|2,776
|align="right"|45.81
|align="right"|*

|Liberal
|Jim Melenchuk
|align="right"|2,492
|align="right"|41.12
|align="right"|*
 
|Prog. Conservative
|Nicholas Stooshinoff
|align="right"|791
|align="right"|13.05
|align="right"|*
|- bgcolor="white"
!align="left" colspan=3|Total
!align="right"|6,059
!align="right"|100.00
!align="right"|

References

External links 
Website of the Legislative Assembly of Saskatchewan
Elections Saskatchewan: Official Results of the 2007 Provincial Election By Electoral Division
Elections Saskatchewan - Official Results of the 2011 Provincial Election
Saskatchewan Archives Board – Saskatchewan Election Results By Electoral Division

Saskatchewan provincial electoral districts
Politics of Saskatoon
1994 establishments in Saskatchewan